Cannon is an unincorporated community in Knox County, Kentucky, United States.

The community was named for early resident Henry L. Cannon, who served as the first postmaster in 1901.

References

Unincorporated communities in Knox County, Kentucky
Unincorporated communities in Kentucky